In molecular biology, the protein domain SAICAR synthase is an enzyme which catalyses a reaction to create SAICAR. In enzymology,  this enzyme is also known as phosphoribosylaminoimidazolesuccinocarboxamide synthase. It is an enzyme that catalyzes the chemical reaction

ATP + 5-amino-1-(5-phospho-D-ribosyl)imidazole-4-carboxylate + L-aspartate  ADP + phosphate + (S)-2-[5-amino-1-(5-phospho-D-ribosyl)imidazole-4-carboxamido]succinate

The 3 substrates of this enzyme are ATP, 5-amino-1-(5-phospho-D-ribosyl)imidazole-4-carboxylate, and L-aspartate, whereas its 3 products are ADP, phosphate, and (S)-2-[5-amino-1-(5-phospho-D-ribosyl)imidazole-4-carboxamido]succinate.

This enzyme belongs to the family of ligases, to be specific those forming carbon-nitrogen bonds as acid-D-amino-acid ligases (peptide synthases).  The systematic name of this enzyme class is 5-amino-1-(5-phospho-D-ribosyl)imidazole-4-carboxylate:L-aspartate ligase (ADP-forming).   This enzyme participates in purine metabolism.

This particular protein family is of huge importance as it is found in all three domains of life. It is the seventh step in the pathway of purine biosynthesis. Purines are vital to all cells as they are involved in energy metabolism and DNA synthesis. Furthermore, they are of specific interest to scientific researchers as the study of the purine biosynthesis pathway could lead to the development of chemotherapeutic drugs. This is because most cancers lack a salvage pathway for adenine nucleotides and rely entirely on the SAICAR pathway.

Protein domain
This protein domain is found in eukaryotes, bacteria and archaea. It is vital for living organisms since it catalyses a step in the purine biosynthesis pathway which aids energy metabolism and DNA synthesis.

Protein domain function
In bacteria and plants this protein domain only catalyses the synthesis of SAICAR. However, in mammals it also catalyses phosphoribosylaminoimidazole carboxylase (AIRC) activity.

Protein domain structure
This particular protein is an octamer made up  of  8 identical subunits. Each monomer consists of a central domain and a C-terminal alpha helix. The central domain consists
of a five-stranded parallel beta sheet  flanked by three alpha helices
one side of the sheet and two alpha helices on the other, forming a three-layer (alpha beta alpha) sandwich.

Structural studies

Other common names
phosphoribosylaminoimidazole-succinocarboxamide synthetase,
 PurC,
 SAICAR synthetase,
 4-(N-succinocarboxamide)-5-aminoimidazole synthetase,
 4-[(N-succinylamino)carbonyl]-5-aminoimidazole ribonucleotide,
 synthetase,
 SAICARs,
 phosphoribosylaminoimidazolesuccinocarboxamide synthetase,
 5-aminoimidazole-4-N-succinocarboxamide ribonucleotide synthetase.

References

 
 
 
 
 
 

EC 6.3.2
Enzymes of known structure
Protein domains